Emma Tahmizian (born 13 December 1957, Plovdiv) is a Bulgarian pianist of Armenian descent.

She debuted at an international level at 11, representing Bulgaria at a concert series in Moscow. She has performed and recorded internationally regularly since she won the 1977 Robert Schumann Competition.

She was subsequently prized at the Tchaikovsky Competition (1982), the Leeds Competition (1984) and the Van Cliburn Competition (1985). Tahmizian premiered Sebastian Currier's Piano Concerto in April 2007.

References
 Şahan Arzruni, at Armenian News Network/Groong
 Leeds Competition historic palmares
 Carnegie Hall Recital Review by Alex Ross, nytimes.com, 26 February 1994. 
 Mosaic Quartet

External links
 

Bulgarian classical pianists
Women classical pianists
Musicians from Plovdiv
Bulgarian people of Armenian descent
Bulgarian emigrants to the United States
Living people
1957 births
21st-century classical pianists